ISO 3166-2:PT is the entry for Portugal in ISO 3166-2, part of the ISO 3166 standard published by the International Organization for Standardization (ISO), which defines codes for the names of the principal subdivisions (e.g., provinces or states) of all countries coded in ISO 3166-1.

Currently for Portugal, ISO 3166-2 codes are defined for 18 districts and 2 autonomous regions.

Each code consists of two parts, separated by a hyphen. The second part is two digits:
 01–18: districts
 20 and 30: autonomous regions (Azores and Madeira)

Current codes
Subdivision names are listed as in the ISO 3166-2 standard published by the ISO 3166 Maintenance Agency (ISO 3166/MA).

See also
 Subdivisions of Portugal
 FIPS region codes of Portugal
 NUTS codes of Portugal

External links
 ISO Online Browsing Platform: PT
 Regions of Portugal, Statoids.com

2:PT
ISO 3166-2
Portugal geography-related lists